Al Rabwah, pronounced as ar-Rabwah, is a residential neighborhood and a subject of Baladiyah al-Malaz in eastern Riyadh, Saudi Arabia. Bordered by Eastern Ring Road to the east and Salah Ad-Din Al Ayyubi Road to the south, the area is popular for its commercial landmarks such as the franchisee of Al-Othaim Markets LuLu Hypermarkets, Alinma Bank, Jarir Bookstore along with urban parks such as al-Nahda Park and Rabwah Park.

The area is also infamous for illegal drifting and vehicle collision incidents mainly due to fishtailing.

References

Neighbourhoods in Riyadh